Compsocerini is a tribe of beetles in the subfamily Cerambycinae, containing the following genera:

 Acabyara
 Achenoderus
 Acrocyrtidus
 Aglaoschema
 Caperonotus
 Chaetosopus
 Chlorethe
 Compsoceridius
 Compsocerus
 Compsopyris
 Cosmisomopsis
 Cosmoplatidius
 Cosmoplatus
 Dilocerus
 Ecoporanga
 Goatacara
 Hylorus
 Maripanus
 Mimochariergus
 Orthostoma
 Protuberonotum
 Rosalia
 Upindauara

References

 
Cerambycinae